Sigmund is an unincorporated community in Upper Milford Township in Lehigh County, Pennsylvania. Sigmund is located near Perkiomen Creek, a tributary of the Schuylkill River. It is a suburb of Allentown in the Lehigh Valley, which has a population of 861,899 and is the 68th most populous metropolitan area in the U.S. as of the 2020 census.

History
A furnace was located here in the early 1800s, first named Hampton, and then Mary Ann, and then Sigmund Furnace. A settlement formed around a store in 1872.  That same year, a post office called "Sigmund" was established. A school was erected in 1877, and a creamery and home were built in 1886. A meeting of the Hereford Literary Society in 1896 noted that "many new members had come in from Harlem, Sigmund and vicinity".

The site contains a coal storage building—now used as a church—erected before 1850, which was previously used to fuel a nearby iron furnace. A stone house at the camp from 1871 was previously Sigmund's post office, general store, and hotel. Two quarries and three lime kilns are also located on camp property. A gym at the camp is open to the community, and is used by the Upper Milford Youth Association.

Public education
Sigmund is served by East Penn School District. Emmaus High School serves grades nine through twelve. Eyer Middle School and Lower Macungie Middle School, both located in Macungie, serve grades six through eight.

References 

Unincorporated communities in Lehigh County, Pennsylvania
Unincorporated communities in Pennsylvania